This is a list of regions of Lebanon by Human Development Index as of 2023 with data for the year 2021.

References 

Lebanon
Lebanon
Human Development Index